Sukhipur is a municipality in Siraha District in the Madhesh Province  of south-eastern Nepal. After the government announcement the municipality was established on 19 September 2015 by merging the existing Mohanpur Kamalpur, Vidhyanagar, Kushaha Laksiminiya, Kabilasi, Silorba Pachhawari Balhi and Sukhipur village development committees (VDCs). The center of the municipality is established in Sukhipur Bazaar. At the time of the 2011 Nepal census after merging the seven VDCs population it had a total population of 20,915 persons. After the government decision the number of municipalities has reached 217 in Nepal.

References

External links
UN map of the municipalities of  Siraha District

Populated places in Siraha District
Nepal municipalities established in 2015
Municipalities in Madhesh Province